Orehovica is a village and municipality in Međimurje County, Croatia. There are three villages in the municipality – Orehovica, Podbrest and Vularija.

In the 2011 census, the municipality had a population of 2,685, with 1,669 people living in Orehovica, 618 in Podbrest and the remaining 398 in Vularija. The majority of the people identified themselves as Croats during the census.

The name Orehovica is derived from oreh 'walnut' in the Kajkavian dialect of Croatian, spoken in Međimurje County. The municipality's coat of arms simply depicts a walnut shell on white background.

Notable people
 

Vatroslav Bertić (1818–1901), Croatian mathematician

References

External links
Municipality's website 

Municipalities of Croatia
Populated places in Međimurje County